Molopo may refer to:

Molopo River, in Botswana and South Africa
, a Singaporean coaster in service in 1964